Linda M. Bingle is an editor and game designer who has worked primarily on role-playing games.

Career
Linda Bingle and her husband Don Bingle were both top-rated RPGA players, and Linda was ranked as second in the world in 1991. They were both shareholders in Pacesetter Ltd in the 1980s, and when they founded the company 54°40' Orphyte in 1991, they purchased many of the product rights to Pacesetter's games and all of its backstock.

Her editing contributions to D&D include the Monstrous Compendium Fiend Folio Appendix (1992) and Ruins of Undermountain II: The Deep Levels (1994).

References

External links
 

Dungeons & Dragons game designers
Living people
Place of birth missing (living people)
Year of birth missing (living people)